Holbrookia lacerata, commonly known as the spot-tailed earless lizard, is a species of phrynosomatid lizard.

Geographic range
It is native to Mexico, in the states of Coahuila, Nuevo León and Tamaulipas, and to the United States, in south-central Texas.

Taxonomy
Originally described as a species, it was once reclassified as a subspecies of the lesser earless lizard, Holbrookia maculata, but has since been again elevated to full species status.

References

Further reading
Boulenger, G.A. 1885. Catalogue of the Lizards in the British Museum (Natural History). Second Edition. Volume II. Iguanidæ... London: Trustees of the British Museum (Natural History). (Taylor and Francis, printers.) xiii + 497 pp. + Plates I.- XXIV. (Holbrookia lacerata, pp. 209–210.)
Cope, E.D. 1880. On the Zoölogical Position of Texas. Bull. United States National Mus. (17): 1-51. (Holbrookia lacerata, sp. nov., pp. 15–16.)

Reptiles of Mexico
Reptiles of the United States
Holbrookia
Taxa named by Edward Drinker Cope
Reptiles described in 1880